These are the election results of the 2013 Malaysian general election by state constituency. State assembly elections were held in Malaysia on 5 May 2013 as part of the general elections. These members of the legislative assembly (MLAs) representing their constituency from the first sitting of respective state legislative assembly to its dissolution.

The state legislature election deposit was set at RM 5,000 per candidate. Similar to previous elections, the election deposit will be forfeited if the particular candidate had failed to secure at least 12.5% or one-eighth of the votes.

Summary

Perlis
For more details on Pelan dan Helaian Mata (Scoresheet) Bahagian Pilihan Raya Negeri Perlis, see footnote

Kedah 
For more details on Pelan dan Helaian Mata (Scoresheet) Bahagian Pilihan Raya Negeri Kedah, see footnote

Kelantan 
For more details on Pelan dan Helaian Mata (Scoresheet) Bahagian Pilihan Raya Negeri Kelantan, see footnote

Terengganu 
For more details on Pelan dan Helaian Mata (Scoresheet) Bahagian Pilihan Raya Negeri Terengganu, see footnote

Penang 
For more details on Pelan dan Helaian Mata (Scoresheet) Bahagian Pilihan Raya Negeri Pulau Pinang, see footnote

Perak 
For more details on Pelan dan Helaian Mata (Scoresheet) Bahagian Pilihan Raya Negeri Perak, see footnote

Pahang 
For more details on Pelan dan Helaian Mata (Scoresheet) Bahagian Pilihan Raya Negeri Pahang, see footnote

Selangor 
For more details on Pelan dan Helaian Mata (Scoresheet) Bahagian Pilihan Raya Negeri Selangor, see footnote

Negeri Sembilan 
For more details on Pelan dan Helaian Mata (Scoresheet) Bahagian Pilihan Raya Negeri Negeri Sembilan, see footnote

Malacca

Johor

Sabah

References 

2013
2013 elections in Malaysia
2013 in Malaysia
Election results in Malaysia